Estaingia bilobata is a species of trilobite from the lower Cambrian period. Their fossils are found chiefly in Australia.

References

 
 
 
 
 

Estaingiidae
Cambrian trilobites of Australia
Emu Bay Shale

Cambrian genus extinctions